United Nations Security Council Resolution 2039 was unanimously adopted on 29 February 2012.

See also 
List of United Nations Security Council Resolutions 2001 to 2100

References

External links
Text of the Resolution at undocs.org

2012 United Nations Security Council resolutions
February 2012 events
2012 in Africa